11-Hydroxyprogesterone (11-OHP) may refer to:

 11α-Hydroxyprogesterone
 11β-Hydroxyprogesterone (21-deoxycorticosterone)

See also
 Hydroxyprogesterone
 Deoxycorticosterone
 Deoxycortisol

Pregnanes